Point Pelee National Park is a national park in Essex County in southwestern Ontario, Canada where it extends into Lake Erie. The word  is French for 'bald'. Point Pelee consists of a peninsula of land, mainly of marsh and woodland habitats, that tapers to a sharp point as it extends into Lake Erie. Middle Island, also part of Point Pelee National Park, was acquired in 2000 and is just north of the Canada–United States border in Lake Erie. Point Pelee is the southernmost point of mainland Canada, and is located on a foundation of glacial sand, silt and gravel that bites into Lake Erie. Established in 1918, Point Pelee was the first national park in Canada to be established for conservation. It was designated as a Ramsar site on 27 May 1987.

History

Aboriginal people lived on Point Pelee for many years before European colonization, dating back to at least 6,000 years. The largest archaeological site found at Point Pelee is thought to have been occupied between AD 700 and 900.

The name was given to the area by Fathers Dollier and Galinée when they passed through the area in 1670.

In the late 1700s, British naval reserves logged the area's white pine for shipbuilding. In 1790, Deputy Indian Agent Alexander McKee negotiated a treaty with Aboriginal communities that ceded a large tract of land, which included Point Pelee, to the Crown. The Caldwell First Nation Chippewa people, who inhabited Point Pelee, were not signatories of that treaty. However, the Crown did not realize this, and their land was ceded nonetheless. Subsequently, they were forced off their land, and Point Pelee remains unceded aboriginal land. This has been publicly acknowledged by the Department of Indian and Northern Affairs Canada.

Prior to the creation of the park, the Great Lakes Ornithological Club was established to study bird migration. One of the members, Percy A. Taverner, and Canada's first Dominion Ornithologist, recommended Point Pelee be made a national park in 1915. Jack Miner had also pushed for the creation of the park by that time. Point Pelee was made a national park in 1918 at the urging of birdwatchers and hunters. Commercial fishing continued in the park until 1969. Point Pelee was the only Canadian national park to allow hunting until duck hunting was ended in 1989. This site was named "Pointe-Pelée" (meaning "bald point") by French explorers because the eastern side was rocky and had no trees.

Point Pelee was designated a dark-sky preserve in 2006, the first Canadian national park to be designated as such. In March 2006, high winds caused waves that washed away the sand point and all that remained was a platform. Since that time the sandy tip continues to shift, grow longer or shorter, or even detach temporarily, from year to year.

Geography

With an area of only , it is Canada's smallest national park. This sandspit is dominated by till plains which were formed during the last ice age during the advance and retreat of the Wisconsonian ice on a submerged limestone ridge. As the glacier melted and retreated northward, the Lake Erie basin began to fill with water. The movement of sediments altered the coastline, resulting in the present-day shape of Point Pelee. Subsequently, over the centuries, a thin but rich soil has formed. Mineral soils in the park were mapped as well to rapidly drained Eastport sand, which has insignificant profile development. The marshes began to form about 3,200 years ago, based on carbon dating. This was also the same time when the sands began to deposit, forming the present day barriers. The marsh has a closed drainage system owing to the separation of it by two barriers along the east and west side, which usually prevents the free exchange of water. However, when lake levels are higher, the marsh water levels fluctuate with the lake's water levels. The distinctive triangular shape at the southern tip of Point Pelee is caused by the convergence of these two barriers (this spit or tip is the southernmost point of the Canadian mainland). Virtually all of Middle Island is forested.

Flora and fauna

Owing to its southernly location and the moderating effects of Lake Erie, the climate in the park is slightly warmer than the rest of Canada and many Carolinian faunal species, which are rare in Canada are located here. Examples include the fox snake and the five-lined skink. Because of its location at the crossroads of 2 major migration flyways, about 347-360 different species of migratory birds have been recorded in the park and more than 100 species stay there for breeding. This total includes 102 waterfowl and shorebird species. Dominic Couzen's Top 100 Birding Sites of the World lists Point Pelee as #66. Coyotes are also present within this park. Many Carolinian floral species that are rare in Canada occur within the park boundaries. Point Pelee has five different habitats: beach, cedar, savanna, dry forest, wet forest, and freshwater marsh. The park contains more than 750 native plant species, of these 8 species are considered to be rare, endangered or threatened in Canada. Nearby Point Pelee is Middle Island which is designated provincially as an Area of Natural and Scientific Interest (ANSI) due to its unique and rare assemblages of plants and animals. Middle Island is home to plants and animals that are characteristic of the Carolinian ecozone of which nine species are at risk. The diversity of vegetation in the marsh is the highest along the edge of the marsh ponds and in the transitional zones between the terrestrial environments and the marsh. Four different vegetation communities dominate in the marsh.

Climate
Point Pelee has a humid continental climate (Dfa under the Köppen climate classification) with warm, humid summers, and cold winters that is modified by the surrounding waters of Lake Erie. It lies in a zone that is characterized by variable weather due to conflict between polar and tropical air masses.
Its position in Lake Erie modifies its climate, resulting in warmer winter and fall temperatures compared to inland regions, as the lake cools more slowly than the surrounding land though during the spring, temperatures remain cooler than inland areas due to the land warming faster than the lake.

Owing to its position in Lake Erie, winter temperatures are warmer than inland locations at a similar latitude due to the release of the heat stored by the lake. As a result, temperatures below  are rare, with only 1.9 days where the temperature reaches or falls below . The maximum temperature usually stays below freezing on most days although mild spells of weather can occur time to time. The park receives  of snowfall per year and there are 30.6 days with measurable snow. The park is not located in the snowbelt region, and snow cover is intermittent through the winter.

Summers are warm and humid with the warmest month, July, averaging , which is among the highest in Ontario. The surrounding lake moderates summertime temperatures, cooling the flow of warm air masses originating from the Gulf of Mexico and as a result, temperatures above  are rare, with only 4–8 days per year in the park.

Human impact

Development
From a regional perspective, the park is isolated from other natural areas because in Essex County, less than 6% of the native forest cover and 3% of the wetlands remain intact. Much of the area (97% of it) has been altered and mostly converted for agriculture, industry or urban development. It is also located relatively close to the major urban area of Windsor-Detroit.

Birdwatching
The park forms the southernmost point in mainland Canada (its latitude is the same as that of Rome, Italy and Barcelona, Spain) and is part of a bird and butterfly migration corridor over Lake Erie via Point Pelee and the Lake Erie islands. Over 360 bird species have been recorded in the park. The peak time for bird migration is spring, especially May, when tired migrants make first landfall after their journey north across the lake.

Many birdwatchers from North America and abroad visit the park in May, often staying in the nearby town of Leamington. One attraction, apart from the sheer numbers and variety of birds passing through on migration, is the opportunity to see more northerly breeding species before they move on.

Occurrences

March 2017 marsh fire
The fire lasted 15 hours and was naturally extinguished due to rainfall the following day.

Commemoration
Point Pelee National Park was featured on a high-value ($5) postage stamp, issued in 1983, as part of a series honouring national parks. The park appeared on a stamp that was issued on 15 January 2018, with a $1.20 face value. The issue coincides with the park's centennial year, and is part of a nine-stamp set featuring scenic views across the country.

Images

See also

National Parks of Canada
List of National Parks of Canada
Long Point, Ontario

References

External links

Point Pelee National Park official website
An article on Point Pelee National Park from The Canadian Encyclopedia

Important Bird Areas of Ontario
National parks in Ontario
Parks in Essex County, Ontario
Ramsar sites in Ontario
Spits of Canada
Protected areas established in 1918
Dark-sky preserves in Canada
Temperate broadleaf and mixed forests in Canada
Birdwatching sites in Canada
Forests of Ontario
1918 establishments in Ontario
Lake Erie